Duved may refer to:

 Đuveč, oven-baked beef  and vegetable stew
 Duved, Sweden, locality situated in Sweden
 Duved (ski area)